A referendum on the Chaco Treaty with Bolivia was held in Paraguay on 15 August 1938. The treaty was approved by 91% of voters.

Background
Following the 1932–1935 Chaco War between Bolivia and Paraguay, a peace conference was held in Buenos Aires. An agreement, the Chaco Treaty, was signed on 21 July 1938, which required ratification within 20 days. In Bolivia the treaty was approved by Congress, while in Paraguay it was put to a referendum.

Results

References

Referendums in Paraguay
1938 in Paraguay
1938 referendums
Chaco War
August 1938 events